San Girolamo dell'Arcoveggio is a Roman Catholic parish church located on Via Dell'Arcoveggio in Bologna, Italy.

History 
The church is dedicated to Saint Jerome. The church was first erected in 1338 in the neighborhood of Arcoveggio, so called due to an ancient arch remaining from a Roman bridge that spanned the Savena river. In 1567, cardinal Gabriele Paleotti converts this into a parish church refurbishing the church in neoclassic style. The bell tower dates to 1880.  An inventory from 1844 noted a painting in the portal of St Jerome. The interior contained altarpieces by il Mastellatta and Ubaldo Gandolfi.

References 

Roman Catholic churches in Bologna
20th-century Roman Catholic church buildings in Italy
Churches completed in 1338
1338 establishments in Europe